Dr. Siti Mariah binti Mahmud (born 14 February 1958) is a Malaysian politician who has served as the Member of the Selangor State Executive Council (EXCO) for the portfolios of Health, Women and Family Empowerment in the Pakatan Harapan (PH) state administration under Menteri Besar Amirudin Shari and Member of the Selangor State Legislative Assembly (MLA) for Seri Serdang since May 2018. She is also a member of the National Trust Party (AMANAH), in the PH opposition coalition. Siti Mariah was the Member of Parliament (MP) for Kota Raja from March 2008 to May 2018 for a decade when she was a member of the Malaysian Islamic Party (PAS) in the Pakatan Rakyat (PR) opposition coalition.

Education
She obtained Bachelor of Medicine (MBBS) from the Cairo University, Master of Physiology from University of London and Master of Business Management (MBA) from National University of Malaysia (UKM).

Early career

Before entering politics, Siti Mariah was a doctor and lecturer.

Political career

Siti Mariah was elected to Parliament in the 2008 Malaysian general election, gaining the seat of Kota Raja from the then-ruling Barisan Nasional (BN) coalition. It was reported that her victory—for the Islamist PAS—came with the support of ethnic Chinese and Indian voters. She was successfully reelected again in the 2013 election but she did not seek a third term reelection for her Kota Raja parliamentary seat in the 2018 election to make way for Mohamad Sabu, the president of AMANAH. She contested and won the Selangor State Legislative Assembly constituency of Seri Serdang instead as AMANAH of PH candidate for the first time.

In 2005, Siti Mariah was the first female candidate for vice-president of PAS, but her candidacy was defeated. She has subsequently been portrayed as representing the "new dynamic progressive voice" of PAS.

Personal life

She has six children.

Election results

References

Living people
1958 births
People from Kedah
Malaysian people of Malay descent
Malaysian Muslims
Malaysian medical doctors
Former Malaysian Islamic Party politicians
Members of the Dewan Rakyat
Women members of the Dewan Rakyat
Members of the Selangor State Legislative Assembly
Selangor state executive councillors
Women MLAs in Selangor
Cairo University alumni
Alumni of the University of London
National University of Malaysia alumni
21st-century Malaysian politicians
21st-century Malaysian women politicians
National Trust Party (Malaysia) politicians